Tramway line T12 Express (known as the Tram-Train Évry-Massy and Tram Express Sud during the planning phase) is a future suburban tram-train line in Paris, France. On 22 January 2014, the STIF published a plan presenting the commissioning of the line in 2020. Initially planned to open in 2020, the opening date of the line has been postponed to 2022, and in May 2021, the opening date of T12 was delayed again to 2023.

History

Original RER Project 
The line of tram-train Évry - Massy finds its origin in the project of Tangential the South or Tangential Southwest, which suggested connecting by a new RER line the city of Versailles, even that of Achères in Yvelines, to that from Melun in Seine-et-Marne, including Massy and Évry.

The project contained several operations:
 The modification of the plan of railways, as well as the creation of a garage, a site of maintenance and a center of management of the operations in Massy-Palaiseau;
 The construction of a completely new line of seven kilometers between Épinay-sur-Orge and Grigny, essentially underground;
 The creation of two new train stations in Épinay-sur-Orge and to Grigny;
 The putting in accessibility of all the stations to the people with reduced mobility;
 The replacement of all of crosswalks by works of engineering;
 The removal of several level crossings on the existing lines.
The studies were presented in committee of follow-up of the STIF on September 23, 2004.

Registered with a 300 million euro budget on the planning contract State-Region in 2000–2006, the project of a global cost about a billion euros was finally abandoned in 2006 considering its cost considered as prohibitive by comparison with its expected effects. The attributed credits were accordingly lost.

Current Project

The tram-train solution 
The STIF then proposed a less expensive solution but questioning all the led studies. On its essonnian part, the project was transformed into a more modest line, but also more viable, connecting Évry with Massy by tram-train, the comfort, the speed and the number of transported passengers being necessarily lower than the initial project.

In February, 2008, the projected calendar was established as it follows:
 File of objectives and main characteristics (dossier d'objectifs et de caractéristiques principales (DOCP)) : in February, 2008;
 Consultation: in May 25 on July 3, 2009;
 Early works: 2015;
 Beginning of the building work of the line: in March, 2017
 Projected putting into service: 2018.
Within the framework of the "Plan Banlieue" approved by the interministerial committee of the cities of June 20, 2008, the State claimed to be ready to finance at the level of 220 million euros "to support at least 4 specific projects of which the Tramway Line 4 towards Clichy-Montfermeil, the Tangentielle Nord, the Massy-Evry tram-train and the connection RER D/RER B (Barreau de Gonesse)".

The public consultation, which was kept during the second semester 2009, had no unanimous result. The proposed plan met oppositions: the association Tangentielle 8, for example, clearly showed its opposition to the project because of the abandonment of the Juvisy-Massy-Versailles direct link. The association rather proposed a RER line Juvisy-Massy-Versailles disconnected from the RER line C, and, in addition, to create a tramway line between Savigny and Évry.

The fate of the section between Versailles-construction sites and Massy-Palaiseau, who is at present a member of the branch C8, was unknown back then. In 2020, this section must be kept in principle in the plan of the RER C, after its connecting in the branch C2 of the RER C ending in the same place (this railway is moreover used by some Norman TGV intersectors every week). It was later decided to extent the line from Massy-Palaiseau to Versailles-Chantiers, in order to replace completely the branch C2. The projected putting into service is towards the end of 2020.

Déclaration d'utilité publique (declaration of public utility) 
The public inquiry of the first phase, that is approximately  connecting the multimodal pole of Évry-Courcouronnes with the station of Massy-Palaiseau, was held from January 7 to February 11, 2013 within the various municipalities concerned by the project. The déclaration d'utilité publique was granted on August 22, 2013.

Work 
The financial plan of the line, to the amount of 455 million euros, is approved on October 7, 2015 by the STIF. The coverage is ventilated between the State (28%), the region Île-de-France (53%), the Essonne departmental council (15%) and SNCF Réseau (4%). Work began at the beginning of 2017, then the validation of the protocol of financing on March 9, 2017 by the regional elected representatives guaranteed the pursuit of the project for the deadlines, with an opening planned in 2020.

Versailles-Chantiers Extension 
At the end of 2008, the SNCF proposed that the section between Versailles-Chantiers and Pont de Rungis (when it will be merged, thanks to the putting into service of the streetcar-train Évry-Massy in 2017) will be integrated into a project of tram-train connecting the stations of Versailles-Chantiers and Sucy-Bonneuil and it will replace the RER C.

However, during the public dialogue on the streetcar-train Évry-Massy, numerous notices expressed themselves in favour of another solution: the extension of the Évry-Massy tram-train to Versailles-Chantiers. Both projects are not compatible.

On January 26, 2011, the State and the Region agreed on the broad guidelines of the public transportation in Île-de-France by quoting the possible extension of the Évry-Massy tram-train to Versailles-Chantiers with the indication of a putting into service planned on 2020.

At the beginning of 2011, the SNCF seemed to notice this choice concerning the section between Versailles-Chantiers and Massy-Palaiseau by suggesting integrating the section between Massy-Palaiseau and Pont de Rungis into a Massy-Palaiseau-Sucy-Bonneuil line via Pont de Rungis.

On May 16, 2013, the STIF officially validated the continuation of the tram-train up to the station of Versailles-Chantiers. The tram-train would completely replace the C8 branch of the RER C. The project was presented in preliminary dialogue from June 1 to July 7, 2013.
 2013: consultation
 2013-2015: Follow-up studies;
 2015: Public inquiry;
 2015-2017: In-depth studies;
 2017: Beginning of the works;
 At the end of 2020: putting into service.

Planned rolling stock 
The line Évry-Massy will be run by twenty one Citadis Dualis tram-trains.

It is capable of strong accelerations and can climb banisters of 65%. Totally accessible to people with reduced mobility or in wheelchairs, it is endowed with a flat floor 38 cm in height, and can transport 250 people. It can circulate in double or triple units to adapt itself to the traffic. The material will be endowed with an air conditioning system, with a space reserved for the people with reduced mobility, of a video surveillance system as well as a system of visual and sound announcement of the served stations, and a bright display from the plan of the line.

Route
Then, in an urban tramway network, it will serve the municipalities of Épinay-sur-Orge, Morsang-sur-Orge, Viry-Châtillon, Grigny, Ris-Orangis, Courcouronnes and finally Évry. It will have interchanges with existing Réseau Express Régional (RER) lines B, C and D.

References

External links
  Official website

Rail transport in Paris
Line 12